Passion: Awakening is an album recorded live at Passion Conferences 10, the 2010 gathering of the Passion. The album was released on March 11, 2010. It took the No. 1 position on Billboard Christian Albums chart upon its debut.

Track listing

Singles
"Our God" (2010) - No. 1 on Billboard Christian charts for 10 weeks
"Healing Is In Your Hands" (2010)

Charts

Awards
The album was nominated for two Dove Awards: Praise & Worship Album of the Year and Special Event Album of the Year, at the 42nd GMA Dove Awards.

References

Passion Conferences albums
2010 live albums